{{DISPLAYTITLE:C17H14O6}}
The molecular formula C17H14O6 may refer to:

 Coeloginin, a phenanthrenoid found in the orchid Coelogyne cristata
 Cirsimaritin, a flavone
 Ermanin, a flavonol
 Involutin
 Kumatakenin, a flavonol
 Pectolinarigenin, a flavone
 Pisatin, a phytoalexin
 Velutin, a flavone